Caroline (stylised in all lowercase) are an English rock band formed in London in 2017, consisting of Casper Hughes, Jasper Llewellyn, Mike O’Malley, Oliver Hamilton, Magdalena McLean, Freddy Wordsworth, Alex McKenzie and Hugh Aynsley.

Career 
The band was formed in 2017 by Jasper Llewellyn, Mike O’Malley and Casper Hughes. Recorded mostly in 2020, their debut album, caroline, was released on February 25, 2022.

Musical style 
caroline is described as a band that approaches various genres such as folk rock and Midwest emo based on post-rock.

Discography

Studio albums 
 Caroline (2022)

References

English post-rock groups
Musical groups from London
Musical groups established in 2017
2017 establishments in England